The North Thames Gas Board was an autonomous state-owned utility area gas board providing gas for light and heat to industries, commercial premises and homes in south-east England. The board's area of supply, encompassing , included parts of the County of London, Berkshire, Buckinghamshire, Essex, Hertfordshire, Middlesex and Surrey.

History 
The North Thames Gas Board was established on 1 May 1949 under the Gas Act 1948 which nationalised the gas industry. The board was responsible to the Minister of Fuel and Power, later the Secretary of State for Trade and Industry, for its operation and finances. The board was dissolved on 31 December 1972 when the North Thames area  became a region of the British Gas Corporation under the Gas Act 1972.

Upon nationalisation the board took over twelve local authority and privately owned gas production and supply utilities:
 Ascot District Gas and Electricity Company (Only the gas operations were acquired: the electricity undertaking had become part of the Southern Electricity Board in 1948).
 Chertsey Gas Consumers' Company Ltd.
 Commercial Gas Company.
 Gas Light and Coke Company.
 Hornsey Gas Company.
 Lea Bridge District Gas Company.
 North Middlesex Gas Company.
 Romford Gas Company.
 Slough Gas and Coke Company.
 Southend-on-Sea County Borough Corporation.
 Uxbridge, Maidenhead, Wycombe and District Gas Company.
 Windsor Royal Gaslight Company.

These organisations operated 26 gas-making stations ranging in capacity from the large Beckton Gas Works ( of gas per day) to the smallest at Amersham ( of gas per day).

The board proposed to extend its gas grid to all gas-making stations and to shutdown and decommission the smallest, oldest and most uneconomic stations. The board concentrated production on those sites on the River Thames where coal could be delivered economically by its own fleet of colliers. As well as gas, coke was a significant by-product of the gas-making process and sales of coke accounted for a fifth to a quarter of total revenue. In addition the board sold a range of other gas-making by-products such as tar, pitch, benzole, ammonia and other refined chemicals

Although named North Thames, the gas board supplied gas to several areas south of the river Thames, including the Richmond, Morden, Chertsey, Ascot, Bracknell and Maidenhead areas.

The North Thames Gas Board operated staff sports clubs, welfare and other leisure activities for employees, inherited from its predecessor the GLCC. Its sports ground, now derelict, is located on Leigh Road in East Ham, next to the North Circular Road, and is also the location of a (now disused) gasometer. At one time, it also operated a sports ground in Acton.

NTGB initials can still be seen on service covers across London dating from the era of its operation.

Operations 
Town gas had traditionally been produced by carbonising (roasting) coal. The majority of gas made by the North Thames Gas Board in 1949 still used this method. In addition water gas was produced by passing steam through white-hot coke. During the 1950s the price of coal, a major feed-stock for gas-making, rose considerably doubling from 64s.3d. (£3.21) per ton in 1950 to 123s.11d. (£6.20) per ton in 1959. The board had to increase its domestic gas price from 1s 4d. per therm in 1951 to 2s 1.85d. per therm in 1957, an increase of 62%. In contrast the domestic price for electricity rose by only 22% in the 1950s and domestic oil prices increased by only 12%. The board found it difficult to further penetrate the domestic and commercial space heating, central heating and other markets. The board instigated new more efficient and cost-effective processes for gas-making including a ‘Gas Integrale’ plant at Kensal Green in 1955, and a plant using low-grade coal at Bromley in 1960. The board also developed process for reforming oil to produce gas including plants at Southall and Romford and butane/air plants at Beckton, Bromley and Fulham. These new processes shifted the production of gas away from coal carbonisation to gas/oil reforming.

The board was also instrumental in the pioneering import of liquefied natural gas, which was first landed at a pilot plant built by North Thames Gas Board on Canvey Island in February 1959. The scheme was successful in supplying natural gas to other gas boards for use as a reformer feed-stock. The North Thames Gas Board, acting for the Gas Council, then designed and built a full-scale methane terminal on Canvey capable of processing 700,000 tons per year of natural gas from Algeria, commissioned in 1964. The national transportation and distribution pipeline from Canvey formed the backbone of the National Transmission System for transporting North Sea gas after it was first landed in Yorkshire in 1967. The board was also responsible for the 1966 pilot scheme on Canvey to convert all domestic, commercial and industrial to natural gas. The conversion programme was extended across Britain over the period 1967–77.

The technical transformation of gas manufacture and processing resulted in a significant reduction in the number of board employees, from about 25,000 in the 1950s to 8,000 in 1988. 

The financial turnover (in £ million) of the board between 1962 and 1971 was:In 1967 the board experienced the worst deficit in its history (£3.35 million). The war in the Middle East resulted in the closure of the Suez Canal, a 50 per cent increase in oil prices, and stoppage of gas import from Algeria. The board's revenue account was in deficit by £4.3 million and there was a drive to cut costs and improve efficiency. Central heating boilers and space heaters were promoted vigorously, and the arrival of natural gas enabled the board to offer attractive rates to industrial consumers.

The growth in gas consumption and the number of customers over the period 1950-1971 is shown in the following tables.

In 1972 with the programme of natural gas conversion 58% complete, the board operated only six gas works: Beckton, Bromley, Fulham, Romford, Slough and Southall, and 34 gas holders (gasometers).

Organisation 
Upon nationalisation the North Thames Gas Board's area was organised into the following districts and divisions: 

 Uxbridge District
 Ascot District
 Windsor District
 Slough District
 Chertsey District
 Western Division
 North Western Division
 North Middlesex District
 Hornsey District
 Central Division
 Northern Division
 Commercial District
 Lea Bridge District
 Eastern Division
 Romford District
 Southend District

The North Thames Gas Board headquarters was located at 30 Kensington Church Street, London from 1949 until 1977. In 1977 the then regional North Thames headquarters was relocated to London Road, Staines-upon-Thames, where the overall control room for the pipe network was located, with sub-control rooms located in Slough and Romford. The nine storey headquarters building, North Thames House, had originally been built for Ready Mixed Concrete for their headquarters but the company had been hit by the recession of the mid-1970s and sold the building. It has since been demolished.

Section 9 of the Gas Act 1948 established consultative councils for each area board. They were charged with considering any matter affecting the supply of gas in the area; and of considering and reporting to the area board any such matter. Each council had between 20 and 30 members. Some members were appointed as representatives of local authorities and some as representatives of commerce, industry, labour and other interests. The North Thames Gas Consultative Council was based at 28 Charing Cross Road. It comprised a chairman, a deputy chairman, a secretary, 16 members representing local authorities, and 11 members representatives of commerce, industry, labour and other interests. The council met six times a year. There were four district committees which met quarterly:

 Berkshire and Buckinghamshire District Committee
 Central and North London District Committee
 East London and Essex District Committee
 West London and Surrey District Committee

Legislative change 
The Gas Act 1972 created a single statutory authority the British Gas Corporation from 1 January 1973. The North Thames Gas Board ceased to exist and North Thames became a region of the British Gas Corporation.

The Gas Act 1986 privatised the British gas industry with the assets of the British Gas Corporation transferred to British Gas plc which started trading on 8 December 1986. North Thames Gas was restructured into eleven districts in 1986:

 Slough
 Staines
 Harrow
 Richmond
 West London
 Central
 Mill Hill
 Thames
 Forest
 Brentwood
 Southend

Key people 
The chairmen of the North Thames Gas Board/Region were:

Sir Michael Milne-Watson (1910 – 1999)         18 January 1949 – 30 April 1964

Richard Stringer Johnson (1907 – 1981)         1 May 1964 – 19 May 1970

George Edward Cooper (1915 – 2004)            20 May 1970 – 31 March 1977

John Gadd (1925 – 1994)                                 1 April 1977 – 31 January 1988

Arthur Allan Dove (1933 – 2017)                      1 February 1988  – 1991

References

External links 

 The Gas (Allocation of Undertakings to Area Boards and Gas Council) Order, 1949 (1949 No. 742)

Former nationalised industries of the United Kingdom
Oil and gas companies of England
1949 establishments in England
1973 disestablishments in England